FK Voska Sport is a football club based in the city of Ohrid, North Macedonia. They are currently competing in the Macedonian Second League.

History
The club was founded in 2019.

Current squad
.

References

External links

FK Voska Sport Facebook Page
Club info at MacedonianFootball 
Football Federation of Macedonia 

Voska Sport
Association football clubs established in 2019
2019 establishments in North Macedonia
Voska Sport